The 1915 Tiverton by-election was held on 30 November 1915.  The by-election was held due to the death of the incumbent Conservative MP, Hon. William Walrond.  It was won by the Conservative candidate Charles Carew who was unopposed due to a War-time electoral pact.

References

1915 in England
Tiverton, Devon
1915 elections in the United Kingdom
By-elections to the Parliament of the United Kingdom in Devon constituencies
1910s in Devon
Unopposed by-elections to the Parliament of the United Kingdom (need citation)